Kara Jane Bajema (born March 24, 1998) is an American professional volleyball player who plays as an outside hitter for the United States women's national volleyball team and Turkish professional club VakıfBank S.K.

Personal life

Bajema was born in Bellingham, Washington to parents Beth and Shane. She spent a few of her early years in Michigan before her family relocated back to Washington. She played soccer until seventh grade before moving on to basketball and volleyball. She has two siblings who are also athletes: an older sister who played soccer at the University of South Carolina, and a brother who plays basketball.

She attended Lynden Christian high school. She was a top 100 national volleyball recruit in her high school class and was a MaxPreps First Team All-American in 2015. She played both volleyball and basketball and led her high school to multiple state titles, earning MVP honors in both sports.

Career

College

Bajema, a star player in both basketball and volleyball, chose to focus on volleyball for the remainder of her career. She was recruited as a middle blocker when she chose to play for the University of Washington, but transitioned to outside hitter before the start of her sophomore season. She played both indoor and beach volleyball for Washington. As a junior in 2018 during her indoor career, her first season as a six-rotation outside hitter, she led the team with 475 kills and 533.5 points, which was the ninth-most in a single season and also the most since 2014. She was named a Third-Team All-American. As a senior in 2019, she broke a 17-year-old school record for most kills in a season with  597, averaging 4.63 per set, and earned First Team All-American honors. She finished her collegiate career ranked sixth in school history with 1,482 kills.

Bajema graduated from Washington in 2020 with a degree in education, Communities, and Organization.

Professional clubs

  Casalmaggiore (2020–2021)
  KS DevelopRes Bella Dolina Rzeszów (2021–2022)
  VakıfBank S.K. (2022–)

USA National Team

In May 2022, Bajema made her national team debut when she was named to the 25-player roster for the 2022 FIVB Volleyball Nations League tournament.

Awards and honors

Clubs

 2021–2022 TAURON Liga –  Silver medal, with KS DevelopRes Bella Dolina Rzeszów.
 2021–2022 Polish Cup  Champion, with KS DevelopRes Bella Dolina Rzeszów.
 2021–2022 Polish Cup – Most Valuable Player, with KS DevelopRes Bella Dolina Rzeszów
 2021–2022 Polish Super Cup  Champion, with KS DevelopRes Bella Dolina Rzeszów.

College

AVCA First Team All-American (2019)
2019-20 Tom Hansen Medal Winner 
AVCA Pacific North Region Player of the Year (2019)
AVCA Third Team All-American (2018)
Pac-12 All-Freshman Team (2016)

External links
Team USA bio

References

1998 births
Living people
Sportspeople from Bellingham, Washington
People from Lynden, Washington
Outside hitters
Middle blockers
American women's volleyball players
American women's beach volleyball players
Washington Huskies women's volleyball players
Washington Huskies women's beach volleyball players
University of Washington College of Education alumni
American expatriate sportspeople in Turkey
American expatriate sportspeople in Italy
American expatriate sportspeople in Poland
Expatriate volleyball players in Italy
Expatriate volleyball players in Turkey
Expatriate volleyball players in Poland
Serie A1 (women's volleyball) players
VakıfBank S.K. volleyballers